Ancient Murphy: Greatest Hits of the 20th Century Vol. 1 is a compilation album of tracks by The Ancestors both previously unreleased and from their released albums.

Track listing
"Already Broken" – 5:56. From A Good Thief Tips His Hat (1999)
"End of the World" – 3:57. From Brigadoon
"Helo" – 4:06. From Brigadoon (1994)
"Turning" – 4:08. Previously unreleased (1993)
"(Not Only) Human" – 4:6. From Brigadoon
"Syd" – 4:11. From Brigadoon (1994)
"Naniwan" – 3:46. Freviously unreleased (1992)
"Black for the Gold" – 4:44. From The Enemies Dance (1991)
"Just Like Me" – 4:35. From The Ancestors (1988)
"Stand" – 5:17. Previously unreleased (1995)
"Analog" – 5:43. Previously unreleased (1994)
"Watching Cities Fall" – 4:44. Previously unreleased (1993)
"Cathedral" – 5:32. Previously unreleased (1993)
"Just Need Some" – 6:22. From Brigadoon (1994)
"The Rain" – 5:46. From The Enemies Dance (1991)

References

2007 albums
The Ancestors (band) albums